Cecilie Pedersen is the name of:

 Cecilie Pedersen (Danish footballer) (born 1983), Danish footballer
 Cecilie Pedersen (Norwegian footballer) (born 1990), Norwegian footballer